New York Zendo Shobo-Ji, or Temple of True Dharma, is a Rinzai zen practice facility located in the upper East Side of Manhattan, New York, in the United States. It is operated by the Zen Studies Society. Founded on September 15, 1968, by Zen master Soen Nakagawa Roshi and Eido Tai Shimano Roshi, the building was converted from a garage, formerly a carriage house. Eido Tai Shimano Roshi, now deceased, was the founding abbot. He was succeeded on January 1, 2011, by the current abbot Roko Sherry Chayat Roshi.

New York Zendo offers daily zazen and chanting services; monthly all-day sits and weekend sesshin providing teisho, dokusan, Dharma talks and practice interviews; and other related events.

See also
Timeline of Zen Buddhism in the United States

External links
Map: 

Buddhist temples in New York City
Japanese-American culture in New York City
Zen centers in New York (state)
Rinzai school
Upper East Side